Heliomystis is a monotypic moth genus in the family Geometridae. Its only species, Heliomystis electrica, the electric moth, is found in the southern half of Australia (New South Wales, Queensland, South Australia, Western Australia and Tasmania). Both the genus and species were first described by Edward Meyrick in 1888.

The forewings are mottled shades of brown with black speckles and lines. These lines are usually stronger in females and diffuse whitish patches are present, particularly on the inner side of the postmedial line.

The larvae feed on Eucalyptus dives and Eucalyptus obliqua. They are green, often darker ventrally or sometimes dorsally, with a whitish spiracular line. The posture of the mature larvae is straight or slightly curved, with the thoracic legs held together and projecting from the body like a thorn from a stick.

References

Moths described in 1888
Pseudoterpnini
Moths of Australia
Monotypic moth genera